Kathleen Ann Roberts-Homstad (born November 17, 1951) is an American luger. She competed at the 1968 Winter Olympics, the 1972 Winter Olympics and the 1976 Winter Olympics.

References

External links
 

1951 births
Living people
American female lugers
Olympic lugers of the United States
Lugers at the 1968 Winter Olympics
Lugers at the 1972 Winter Olympics
Lugers at the 1976 Winter Olympics
People from Miles City, Montana
21st-century American women